The 2015–16 Hampton Pirates men's basketball team represented Hampton University during the 2015–16 NCAA Division I men's basketball season. The Pirates, led by seventh year head coach Edward Joyner, played their home games at the Hampton Convocation Center and were members of the Mid-Eastern Athletic Conference. They finished the season 21–11, 13–3 in MEAC play to win the MEAC regular season championship. They defeated Morgan State, Savannah State, and South Carolina State to be champions of the MEAC tournament. They earned the conference's automatic bid to the NCAA tournament where they lost in the first round to Virginia.

Roster

Schedule

|-
!colspan=9 style="background:#00216E; color:#FFFFFF;"| Regular season

|-
!colspan=9 style="background:#00216E; color:#FFFFFF;"| MEAC tournament

|-
!colspan=9 style="background:#00216E; color:#FFFFFF;"| NCAA tournament

References

Hampton Pirates men's basketball seasons
Hampton
Hampton
Hampton Pirates
Hampton Pirates